Jan Zamoyski (1542–1605) was a Polish magnate, grand chancellor and grand hetman of the Crown. 

Jan Zamoyski may also refer to:
 Jan Jakub Zamoyski (1716–1790), Polish magnate, voivode of Podolia
 Jan Kanty Zamoyski (1900–1961), Polish aristocrat
 Jan Tomasz Zamoyski (1912–2002), Polish politician
 Jan Zamoyski (died 1619), Polish magnate, castellan of Chełm
 Jan Zamoyski (1627–1665) or Sobiepan, Polish magnate, voivode of Kiev and Sandomierz